The 1986 Oregon Ducks football team represented the University of Oregon in the 1986 NCAA Division I-A football season. Playing as a member of the Pacific-10 Conference (Pac-10), the team was led by head coach Rich Brooks, in his tenth year, and played their home games at Autzen Stadium in Eugene, Oregon. They finished the season with a record of five wins and six losses (5–6 overall, 3–5 in

Schedule

Roster

NFL draft
Two Ducks were selected in the 1987 NFL Draft, which lasted twelve rounds (335 selections).

References

Oregon
Oregon Ducks football seasons
Oregon Ducks football